Qarajalar may refer to:

 Salarabad, Zanjan (AKA Qarajalar), a village in Qareh Poshtelu-e Pain Rural District, Qareh Poshtelu District, Zanjan County, Zanjan Province, Iran
 Qaracalar, a village and municipality in the Saatly Rayon of Azerbaijan
 , a village in Gardabani Municipality, Georgia
 Karacalar (disambiguation)